The 1939–40 season was the 43rd in the history of the Western Football League.

Upon the outbreak of World War II in 1939, many clubs left the Western League and it was reduced to a single division of eleven clubs. The champions for the first time in their history were Trowbridge Town, though they had won the old Division Two the previous season. This was the last season for the Western League until 1945–46, as all normal football activity was suspended during the war.

Final Table
The league was reduced to a single division of eleven clubs after the departure of Bath City, Bristol City "A", Bristol Rovers Reserves and their "A" team, Frome Town, Lovells Athletic, Poole Town, Portland United, Salisbury City, Street, Torquay United Reserves, Warminster Town, Weymouth, and Yeovil and Petters United and their reserve team. Two new clubs joined the league:

Bristol Aeroplane Company
Peasedown Miners Welfare, rejoining after leaving the league as Peasedown St John in 1925.

References

1939-40
4